Patrik Macej (born 11 June 1994) is a former Czech football player who spent most of his career in clubs across Slovakia, playing as a goalkeeper. He had to retire at a young age of 25, due to continued back problems.

Career
Macej has played international football at under-16 level for Czech Republic U16, under-17 Czech Republic U17 and under-18 level for Czech Republic U18.

Macej made his Fortuna Liga debut for Zemplín Michalovce against AS Trenčín on 16 July 2016.

References

External links
MFK Zemplín Michalovce official club profile
Futbalnet profile

 Patrik Macej official international statistics

1994 births
Living people
Sportspeople from Ostrava
Czech footballers
Czech expatriate footballers
Czech Republic youth international footballers
Czech Republic under-21 international footballers
Association football goalkeepers
FC Baník Ostrava players
MFK Zemplín Michalovce players
FK Slavoj Trebišov players
FC Lokomotíva Košice players
FC DAC 1904 Dunajská Streda players
FK Železiarne Podbrezová players
Slovak Super Liga players
2. Liga (Slovakia) players
Expatriate footballers in Slovakia
Czech expatriate sportspeople in Slovakia